Cédric Kouadio (born 25 July 1997) is an Ivorian professional football forward who plays for Dinamo Brest.

References

External links 
 
 

1997 births
Living people
Ivorian footballers
Ivorian expatriate footballers
Association football forwards
ES Bingerville players
FC Slovan Liberec players
FC Slutsk players
FC Torpedo Minsk players
FC Shakhter Karagandy players
FC Neman Grodno players
FC Dynamo Brest players
Ivorian expatriate sportspeople in the Czech Republic
Ivorian expatriate sportspeople in Belarus
Ivorian expatriate sportspeople in Kazakhstan
Expatriate footballers in the Czech Republic
Expatriate footballers in Belarus
Expatriate footballers in Kazakhstan
Ivory Coast youth international footballers